St Alouarn Islands  are a group of islands and rocks south-east of Cape Leeuwin in Western Australia, approximately 11 km south of Augusta in Flinders Bay.

History
In 1772 Louis de St Alouarn in the Le Gros Ventre was in the region as part of the expedition of Kerguelen, and subsequently the islands were named in 1792, after Captain de St Alouarn, by French navigator Antoine d'Entrecasteaux.

Location
The Point Matthew lookout on the road between Augusta and Cape Leeuwin, that has the islands identified in a brass compass plate that also identifies distances.

Wrecks
There are a number of wrecks in the vicinity of Cape Leeuwin.

The best-known wreck near the islands was that of the Aberdeen White Star ship SS Pericles on an uncharted rock on 13 March 1910, within sight of the Cape Leeuwin Lighthouse in daylight hours.

Whale watching boats leaving from Augusta Port tend not to venture into this group of islands and rocks, but travel around Flinders Bay to the east of the islands.

The islands are significant for their bird colonies - with Seal Island and St Alouarn Island being reserves for that purpose.

The named islands, in order of distance from mainland are:

Named islands and rocks

Seal Island
 Seal Island (Augusta, Western Australia) - is a large flat brownish rock, 1.5 km south of Point Matthew.
 possibly named by George Vancouver in 1791, recorded by Archdeacon in 1878
  Status: Seal Island Nature Reserve - National Parks and Nature Conservation Authority
  Size: approx 4 ha in area - Conservation of Fauna reserve

Saint Alouarn Island
 Saint Alouarn Island 
- 5.5 km south east of Point Matthew
 Created as an A class reserve  - May 1960
 Named a Wildlife Sanctuary - December 1972
 Named a Nature Reserve - May 1979  
  Saint Alouarn Island Nature Reserve - 
  Size: approx 8.5 ha in area - Conservation of Fauna reserve

Flinders Island

 Flinders Islet (also Flinders Island) - 
(also identified by some sources as Flinders Island
 Named Island in Admiralty Chart 1037 of 1878
 Vested as 'Flinders Island and various rocks south of Augusta' as 'A' reserve in 1986.

 Named as part of a sanctuary zone in the Ngari Capes Marine Park

- 7 km south east of Point Matthew

Rocks

There are a few named rocks in the group

 Square Rock - 7.5 km south east of Point Matthew
 South-West Breaker - approximately 9 km south-southwest of Point Matthew is the farthest named rock from the mainland.

Unnamed rocks run parallel to the line of named islands above, between Cape Leeuwin and South-West Breaker, with one exception - Spout Rock, west of Flinders Islet.

Augusta Port
In 2009, the gazettal of the Augusta Port Area delineated the port in reference to the northernmost point (at High water level) on Saint Alouarn Island (with truncated spelling), as well as Seal Island, and Point Matthew.

In 2013 - 2013, the Western Australian government, through the Royalties for Regions programme, constructed a new harbour outside of the Hardy Inlet area of the Blackwood River mouth.

The port is to the south, and within view of Flinders Bay settlement and boat ramp.  It is located adjacent to the road that goes to Cape Leeuwin lighthouse.

Oceangoing vessels had previously anchored in Flinders Bay, or used the Flinders Bay jetty; however, its short-term operation between the 1890s and 1930s subsequently left the bay with no port facility.

See also
 List of islands of Western Australia

Notes

Further reading
 Edward Duyker & Maryse Duyker, ed. & trans) Bruny d’Entrecasteaux: Voyage to Australia and the Pacific 1791—1793, Miegunyah/Melbourne University Press, Melbourne, 2001, p. 108.
 Fornasiero, Jean; Monteath, Peter and West-Sooby, John.  Encountering Terra Australis: the Australian voyages of Nicholas Baudin and Matthew Flinders, Kent Town, South Australia,Wakefield Press,2004. 
 Godard, P. & Kerros, T. de, Louis de Saint-Aloüarn, Lieutenant des vaisseaux du Roy: Un marin breton à la conquête des Terres Australes, Les Portes du Large, Saint-Jacques-de-la-Lande, 2002.
 CALM/DOLA  1996. Land Management Series Map Sheet 1929-3 Leeuwin Edition 11:50000.

 
Islands of the South West (Western Australia)
Nature reserves in Western Australia
Flinders Bay, Western Australia